Moorea Airport  is an airport serving the island of Moorea in French Polynesia, France.
It is also known as Temae Airport or Moorea Temae Airport for its location near the village of Temae in northeastern Moorea. The airport opened on October 6, 1967.

History

 27 March 1967: Construction of the runway at Moorea‑Temae.
 6 October 1967: Opening of the Temae airfield. 
 1977: The Moorea-Temae aerodrome is transferred to the SETIL - Société d'Équipement de Tahiti et des Iles (Equipment Company of Tahiti and the Islands). 
 1982: Construction of the existing terminal and adding additional parking spaces. 
 1987: Lengthening the runway to accommodate ATR 42. 
 1990: Construction of a new control tower. 
 2003: Work and upgrading to accommodate ATR 72.

Facilities

Airlines and destinations

Passenger

Ground Transportation
The Moorea Tour Bus comes to the airport to pick up or drop off people. The bus is yellow and green.

Accidents and Incidents
 On August 9, 2007, Air Moorea Flight 1121 crashed shortly after taking off from Temae Airport. The de Havilland Canada DHC-6 Twin Otter was bound for Tahiti's Faa'a International Airport. The report found that the crash was caused by the failure of the pitch control cables following the retraction of the flaps after take-off, which causes significant torque on that aircraft and thus additional pressure on the cables. The failure was caused by significant wear due to the lack of special maintenance and inspections for the stainless-steel cables (which are more subject to wear than their carbon steel counterparts), and exacerbated by the jet-blast of an A340 while the aircraft was parked. Another contributory cause for the crash were found to be the lack of pilot training for loss of pitch control. All 19 passengers and the sole crew member died. Amongst those 19 passengers were two European Union officials.

Annual statistics
Annual statistics for Moorea Airport:

See also
 Air Moorea Flight 1121
 List of airports in French Polynesia

References

External links
 

Airports in French Polynesia
Mo'orea